John Mullings Aldridge was an Anglican priest during the second half of the nineteenth century and the first decades of the 20th.

Aldridge was educated at Trinity College, Dublin. He was ordained deacon and priest in 1870. After a curacy in Kilcummin he held incumbencies at Eyrecourt, Forfar West Bridgford, Clanfield and Meysey Hampton.  He was Dean of Clonfert from 1907 to 1920.

References

Deans of Clonfert
20th-century Irish Anglican priests
19th-century Irish Anglican priests
Alumni of Trinity College Dublin